P.O. Atsaleniou, short for Panathlitikos Omililos Atsaleniou (translated Pan-athletic Club of Atsalenio) and  also known simply as Atsalenios or POA, is a Greek association football club based in the suburb Atsalenio of Heraklion, the largest city on the island of Crete. The club's short name Atsalenios can literally be translated made of steel (being the Greek word for steel). The club currently competes in the Gamma Ethniki, the third tier of the Greek football league system. The club's crest is a vine leaf and its traditional colours are green and white.

History
 Atsalenios was founded in 1951 as the Pan-athletic Club of Atsalenio by Asia minor refugees occupying the Atsalenio suburb, located in the southern area of the city of Heraklion, Crete. Since 1960, the club hosts its home games at the Atsalenios Stadium, a privately owned football stadium with a capacity of 1,500 spectators.

In 1964, the club competed in the Beta Ethniki, the second tier of the Greek football league system for the first time in its history. Since 1976, Atsalenios has consecutively competed at national competitions, either as an amateur or professional club playing in the Delta Ethniki, the fourth tier of the Greek football league system. In 2003, Atsalenios was promoted to the Gamma Ethniki, featuring in seven consecutive seasons before being relegated in 2010. The club has since briefly resurfaced in the 2013–14 Gamma Ethniki, where it was relegated to Heraklion FCA regional competitions for the first time in 38 years, after finishing 8th in the Gamma Ethniki Group 5. Then it once again achieved promotion to the Gamma Ethniki during the 2015−16 season, when the club was crowned champions of Heraklion by finishing first in the regional league, and eventually placing first in the 2016 FCA Winners' Championship.

Atsalenios currently holds the record for most Heraklion FCA Cup trophies won since the competition was established in 1971, with a total of 12 wins. The club has also claimed 9 Heraklion FCA Championships, second-most behind modern Superleague regulars OFI.

Atsalenios maintains its own football academies, having produced a number of players that have since moved on to more prestigious clubs in Heraklion, such as OFI Crete and Ergotelis, as well as other Greek Superleague clubs. Some of the most renowned players to emerge from Atsalenios' infrastructure segments include Michalis Sifakis (former Greek champion with Olympiacos, 15 international caps with the Greece national football team), his father Myron (1986−87 Greek Cup winner with OFI Crete), Manolis Roubakis, Petros Giakoumakis and others.

Players

Current squad

Honours

Domestic
 Delta Ethniki
Winners (2): 2002−03, 2012−13
 FCA Winners' Championship
Winners (2): 1988, 2016

Regional
 Heraklion FCA Championship
Winners (9): 1962−63, 1965−66, 1970−71, 1973−74, 1984−85, 1987−88, 1994−95, 1996−97, 2015−16
 Heraklion FCA Cup
Winners (12) (record): 1974−75, 1977−78, 1983−84, 1985−86, 1986−87, 1990−91, 1996−97, 1997−98, 2000−01, 2002−03, 2014−15, 2018–19

Notable former players

Greece                                                               
 Michalis Sifakis                                                              
 Manolis Roubakis
 Michail Fragoulakis
 Petros Giakoumakis
 Giorgos Giakoumakis
 Grigorios Athanasiou
 Dimitris Hasomeris
 Dimitris Karademitros
 Stefanos Vavoulas
 Thanasis Patiniotis
 Anestis Anastasiadis

Europe
 Miguel Agostinho Oliveira
 Marco Meireles

Africa
 Ebus Onuchukwu
 Rasheed Alabi
 Edouard Oum Ndeki

America
 Fernando Benitez
 Abel Masuero

Managerial history
 Rajko Janjanin (1996–2002)
 Pavlos Dermitzakis (2002–2007)
 Ioannis Taousianis (2007–2008)
 Thanasis Kolitsidakis (2008–2009)
 Manolis Patemtzis (2009–2015)
 Vasilis Krasanakis (2015–2017 )
 Manolis Soutzis (2017–2018 )
 Manolis Skyvalos (2018–2020 )
 Antonis Androulakis (2020-2021)
 Anestis Anastasiadis (2021- )

References

Gamma Ethniki clubs
Sport in Heraklion
Football clubs in Heraklion
Football clubs in Crete
Association football clubs established in 1951
1951 establishments in Greece